Neopectinimura madangensis is a moth in the family Lecithoceridae. It is found in Papua New Guinea.

The wingspan is 10 mm. The forewing ground color is silvery white in the upper one third, but covered with brownish dense scales in the lower two-thirds of the wing. The hindwings are orange gray, elongate and slightly narrower than the forewings.

Etymology
The species name is derived from Madang, the type locality.

References

Moths described in 2010
madangensis